Tomasz Młodzianowski (coat of arms Dąbrowa) (born 21 December 1622 near Ciechanów, died 3 or 9 October 1686 in Wolbrom) was a Polish Jesuit, preacher and writer.

Life 
He was a member of Mazovian yeomanry (drobna szlachta). In 1637 he began the Jesuit novitiate. In 1648 he received the holy orders. From 1654 to 1656 he was a missionary in Isfahan. While coming back he visited the Holy Land. He has been a lecturer in the colleges in various cities of the Polish–Lithuanian Commonwealth, and a chaplain. In 1673 he became the deputy provincial. From 1680 to 1683 he was the rector in the well-known college in Poznań. After his death king John III Sobieski said: The order of the Society has a great loss in this man. He was buried in the church of saint Peter and Paul in Kraków.

Works 
He won the fame of a great preacher. In 1674 he was speaking in the coronation mass of John III Sobieski. He has written down 73 homilies and 179 sermons. He used to publish occasional speeches separately. The rest is collected in his Kazania i Homilie (Poznań 1681), with over 2,000 pages in folio in four volumes. He used to avoid macaronic language, speak clearly, make the lecture interesting through concepts, explain abstract ideas to the audience (e.g. comparing the apostles to the MPs), include proverbs. His other works are:
 Praelectiones (1666-1674) – a series of handbooks presenting full theology and philosophy
 Integer cursus theologicus et philosophicus – a revised and expanded version of the above
 Rozmyślania albo Lekcya duchowna – meditations, in 1680-1754 published 6 times
 Akty przygotowania się na śmierć – about good death, between 1685 and 1758 edited 7 times

See also 
 Mikołaj Łęczycki
 Kasper Drużbicki
 Daniel Pawłowski
 Jan Morawski

Bibliography 
Nowy Korbut, ed. Roman Pollak, v. 2, Warszawa 1964, p. 526-527.
Kasper Niesiecki, Herbarz polski, v. VI, Leipzig 1841, p. 427-429.

External links
 Works by Tomasz Młodzianowski in digital library Polona

1622 births
1686 deaths
17th-century Christian mystics
17th-century Latin-language writers
17th-century Polish Jesuits
Roman Catholic mystics
Polish male writers
Adam Mickiewicz University in Poznań
Polish Roman Catholic missionaries
Jesuit missionaries
Roman Catholic missionaries in Iran
17th-century male writers

17th-century Polish philosophers